Sophie Rebecca (born ) is an English ballet dancer who was the first openly transgender person to train on the Royal Academy of Dance's courses for female dancers. The academy changed its policy in 2013 and no longer insists that students taking these courses must have been born female.

References 

Living people
English ballerinas
English LGBT people
People from North Yorkshire
Transgender women
Transgender dancers
Year of birth missing (living people)